Swansea is a town in the heart of Tasmania's east coast, on the north-west shore of Great Oyster Bay and overlooking Freycinet National Park. It was the first municipality in Australia to be established after Hobart and Sydney.

The town was formed in 1821 and celebrated its 200th birthday in 2021.

History
The first European to explore the Swansea area was Captain John Henry Cox sailing from England to Sydney. He took his ship, the Mercury, up the eastern coast of Tasmania. On 3 July 1789, having heard of vast colonies of seals in the area, he sailed along the western shore of Maria Island and into a stretch of water he named Oyster Bay.

Swansea was not settled until 1821 when George Meredith, his family and workers arrived from Pembrokeshire, Wales. Meredith obtained a grant from Lieutenant Governor William Sorell to farm in the area around Oyster Bay. The land was developed and made suitable for seasonal crops and grazing stock and a tannery and flour mill were established by the Meredith River. Whaling stations were also set up on nearby islands to enable the export of whale oil. Swansea was originally called Great Swanport and Meredith built the family home, Cambria, which is now in private hands. There are other important buildings in the town including Morris’ General Store which has been owned and run by the Morris family for over 100 years. The Swansea Bark Mill which processed black wattle bark was used in colonial times in the tanning industry and is now a combined museum, tavern and bakery. Schouten House is a fine early Victorian colonial house built in 1844 and is now a hotel.

Waterloo Point Post Office opened on 6 September 1832 and was renamed Swansea around 1863.

Wildlife
Swansea is home to colonies of short-tailed shearwaters (muttonbirds) and little penguins. The nearby Freycinet National Park has quolls, wallabies, native microbats, possums and Tasmanian devils. Offshore, there are dolphins, whales and seals.

Climate

Demographics
According to the 1996 census, the town's population was 495. Of the population, 25.1% were above the age of 65 – making it the Tasmanian town with the largest percentage of over-65-year-olds.

References

Towns in Tasmania
Localities of Glamorgan–Spring Bay Council